Lonna Hooks is the former Secretary of State of New Jersey. She served for four years in the Cabinet of former New Jersey Gov. Christine Todd Whitman.  Governor Whitman said that Secretary Hooks was her business ombudsman as secretary of state.

Biography 
Prior to her appointment as Secretary of State, Hooks had been an attorney at Schering-Plough, and had served under Whitman at the New Jersey Board of Public Utilities as her chief of staff. Whitman announced in December 1993 that she would nominate Hooks to serve as Secretary of State.

Hooks is a graduate of Howard University and the Howard University School of Law. She has been a resident of Montclair, New Jersey.

References

External links

Living people
Year of birth missing (living people)
Howard University alumni
New Jersey lawyers
People from Montclair, New Jersey
Secretaries of State of New Jersey
New Jersey Republicans
African-American people in New Jersey politics
21st-century African-American people